Pursuant to Article 58 of the Law on Internal Regulations of the Islamic Consultative Assembly (Parliament of the Islamic Republic of Iran), the Agriculture, Water, Natural Resources and Environment Commission of the Islamic Consultative Assembly is formed to perform its assigned duties in the fields of agriculture, water resources, livestock and poultry, fisheries, the environment and meteorology in accordance with the provisions of the regulation.

Some of the responsibilities of this commission are:

 Confirmation of the vote of confidence of the parliament to the proposed minister for the Ministry of Agriculture Jihad
 Review the plans of the ministers related to agriculture, water and natural resources and the environment
 Provide statistics related to the climate and natural resources of the country
 Review and approval of plans and bills related to agriculture affairs and related products
 Take corrective measures for proper distribution of fruits and other natural products in the country
 Review and approval of plans and bills related to the climate and natural environment of the country
 Review and approval of plans and bills related to the expansion of agricultural knowledge in the country
 Review and approval of plans and bills related to the development of knowledge-based companies in the fields of agriculture, water and natural resources and the environment
 Investigation of rural and agricultural-oriented government organizations
 Review and approval of plans and bills related to the country's food industry
 Review and approval of plans and bills related to the country's food distribution system
 Supervision of the country's agricultural insurance fund
 Review and approval of plans and bills related to the country's water resources
 Review and approval of plans and bills related to the export and import and exchanges of the agricultural products
 Review and approval of plans and bills related to the country's agricultural budget
 Review the performance of the Department of Environment
 Monitoring the pricing of food products in the country
 Review the performance of the Ministry of Agriculture Jihad
 Review and approval of plans and bills in the field of education and promotion of modern agriculture
 Review and approval of plans and bills in the field of fisheries and aquaculture
 Review and approval of plans and bills about the country's livestock industry

Members 
The members of the Agriculture, Water, Natural Resources and Environment Commission of the Islamic Consultative Assembly in the second year of the 11th term of the Assembly are as follows:

See also 
 Program, Budget and Accounting Commission of the Islamic Consultative Assembly
 Education, Research and Technology Commission of the Islamic Consultative Assembly
 Social Commission of the Islamic Consultative Assembly
 Health and Medical Commission of the Islamic Consultative Assembly
 Judiciary and Legal Commission of the Islamic Consultative Assembly
 Industries and Mines Commission of the Islamic Consultative Assembly
 Civil Commission of the Islamic Consultative Assembly
 Cultural Commission of the Islamic Consultative Assembly
 The history of the parliament in Iran

References

Committees of the Iranian Parliament
Islamic Consultative Assembly